Singaparna is a district which serves as the regency seat of Tasikmalaya Regency in West Java, Indonesia. it is located about 10 km west of Tasikmalaya city. The total area of Singaparna district is around 2,482 hectare, which divided into 10 administrative villages (desa). Most of the land in Singaparna are used for agriculture and habitation.

Climate
Singaparna has a tropical rainforest climate (Af) with heavy to very heavy rainfall year-round.

References

Populated places in West Java
Regency seats of West Java
Tasikmalaya Regency